The Forest Service Northern Ireland is an executive agency of the Department of Agriculture and Rural Development entrusted with the development of forestry and the management of forests in Northern Ireland. It was created on 1 April 1998.

The Forest Service holds headquarters at Inishkeen House in Enniskillen and forest offices in Castlewellan and Garvagh. It manages 62,000 hectares of forest and employs 205 people.

References 
Inline

Other

 

Northern Ireland Executive
Forestry agencies in the United Kingdom
Organisations based in Belfast
Rural society in the United Kingdom
1998 establishments in Northern Ireland
Forests and woodlands of Northern Ireland
Forestry in Ireland